Elizabeth Álvarez (Born Elizabeth Álvarez Ronquillo on August 30, 1977, in Ciudad Juárez, Chihuahua, Mexico) is a Mexican telenovela actress.

Career
Elizabeth Álvarez was chosen to be on the third edition of Big Brother VIP but was voted off in 2004. She studied at the Televisa's Centro de Educación Artística (CEA - Center of Artistic Education).

Filmography

Awards and nominations

TVyNovelas Awards

Kids Choice Awards México

Premios El Heraldo de México

References

External links

1977 births
Living people
Mexican telenovela actresses
Mexican television actresses
Mexican film actresses
21st-century Mexican actresses
Actresses from Chihuahua (state)
People from Ciudad Juárez